Pristimantis truebae is a species of frog in the family Strabomantidae.

It is endemic to Ecuador.
Its natural habitats are tropical moist montane forests, high-altitude shrubland, and high-altitude grassland.
It is threatened by habitat loss.

References

truebae
Endemic fauna of Ecuador
Amphibians of Ecuador
Amphibians of the Andes
Amphibians described in 1997
Taxonomy articles created by Polbot